Coupe D.O.M. was a cup played by clubs from French Guiana, Guadeloupe, Martinique, Mayotte and Réunion.

D.O.M. stands for Départements d'Outre-Mer, which includes French Guiana, Guadeloupe, Martinique, Réunion and Mayotte. The other D.O.M., Saint Pierre and Miquelon, did not enter as the standard of their football was too low.

In 2004 the competition was reorganised as the Éliminatoires Antilles-Guyane. Since then, teams from French Guiana, Guadeloupe, Martinique played in a league format, with the top two teams qualifying for the Outremer Champions Cup. The champions of Réunion do not enter Éliminatoires Antilles-Guyane anymore, but play off with the Mayotte champions for the right to enter the Outremer Champions Cup.

The tournament is likely to be reorganised in future years following a June 2007 announcement by the French Football Federation.

Previous winners

Éliminatoires Antilles-Guyane

References

External links
France - Coupe des clubs champions d'Outremer (Coupe D.O.M.-T.O.M.), RSSSF.com

Football competitions in Martinique
Football competitions in Réunion
Football competitions in French Guiana
Football competitions in Guadeloupe
International club association football competitions in the Caribbean
International club association football competitions in Africa
DOm
French football friendly trophies